The First Presbyterian Church, located in Cottage Grove, Oregon, is listed on the National Register of Historic Places.

It was designed by Italian-born architect Pietro Belluschi in what came to be known as Pacific Northwest architecture style during 1948-51 and was built in 1951.  It was listed on the NRHP in 1974;  the listing included one contributing building and one other contributing structure.

Its NRHP nomination quoted Marion Ross as saying "'The First Presbyterian Church in Cottage Grove, finished in 1951, is the
least traditional and probably the best of Belluschi's Oregon churches.  The material is all wood, and while there is no obvious suggestion of the forms of vernacular building, there can be no doubt that it is suitable for the small community in which it is sited. It would seem that in this design Belluschi had become so imbued with the spirit of the region that no obvious similarity of shape was necessary to give it the feeling of belonging."'

See also
National Register of Historic Places listings in Lane County, Oregon

References

1951 establishments in Oregon
Buildings and structures in Cottage Grove, Oregon
National Register of Historic Places in Lane County, Oregon
Pietro Belluschi buildings
Presbyterian churches in Oregon
Churches on the National Register of Historic Places in Oregon
Churches completed in 1951
20th-century Presbyterian church buildings in the United States